Antolín Pulido Vázquez (born 23 October 1962) is a Spanish Marxist writer and theorist, participant in different conflict areas as a member of the Peace Brigades International.

Biography 
Antolín Pulido was born in 1962, in Talavera de la Reina, located in the province of Toledo. In 1970, during the dictatorship of Francisco Franco and at the age of 8, Pulido left Spain, traveling through various countries until his arrival in Cuba. During his stay in the Caribbean country, he studied Pedagogy (where he attended classes with the writer Mario Benedetti, with whom he befriended), Anthropology and Social Theater at the University of Havana. After completing his higher education, he obtained the rank of military lieutenant and asked to be a volunteer brigadier in Angola, where he became a major in the Cuban army. 

At the end of the 70s, when Pulido was 17 years old, he met Jimena, a Chilean woman with whom he fell in love, on the Isla de la Juventud. At the time, they would go to live together in the city of Havana, leaving Jimena pregnant. When she was about to give birth, she flew to Chile to share the news with her family, however, since 1973 the country had been mired in the military dictatorship of Augusto Pinochet and forced disappearances occurred very frequently. Jimena was unable to leave the airport, when she got off the plane she was arrested and murdered along with her unborn daughter, throwing her alive from a helicopter into the sea, victim of the death flights of the Pinochet regime. This dramatic episode marked the life of Pulido who decided "to fight anything that means something like Jimena's murderers."

In 1979, he participated in a meeting of the grandchildren of the International Brigadistas who fought during the Spanish Civil War, thus beginning his stage as a brigadier, with missions in war zones to evacuate children from places of conflict. He traveled to Nicaragua during the Sandinista Revolution, where he taught while "carrying a hanging Kalashnikov." He was part of a "non-existent organization", which did not claim his actions, called "Liberté" where he carried out work to evacuate child slaves and fight against the trafficking of organs. In his trilogy The Memory of Nobody captured these experiences in writing although, not finding a publisher for Spain "because of the names and brands of weapons that appeared there," he had to self-finance its publication.

As an international brigadista, Pulido has worked as a mediator in war conflicts in Rwanda, Sarajevo or Tindouf, collaborator in the evacuations of children and slaves, attending to the needs of different NGOs in emergency situations, humanitarian aid and development cooperation. Throughout his life he has worked as a mediator in war conflicts and kidnappings, a collaborator in the evacuations of children and slaves, an international brigade member and a member of organizations for emergency aid, humanitarian aid and development cooperation, among other occupations.

Works 

 2016 – La memoria de los Nadie. Volumen 1.  .
 2016 – La memoria de los Nadie. Volumen 2.
 2016 – La memoria de los Nadie. Volumen 3.
 2019 – Teatrillos con memoria. (Teatro) Editorial Buenos Días República.
 2019 – Textos de Combate de ahorita mismo.
 Textos urgentes de cuentautor de guardia
 Panfletos de amor y lucha
 Isla Resistencia
 Justicia a traguitos carrasposos
 Nosotras
 Textos de combate de ahorita mismo
 Caramelos de acero
 Cuaderno de bitácora de Quico
 Sangre verde

References 

Living people
1962 births
20th-century Spanish writers
University of Havana alumni
People from Talavera de la Reina